Vastine Wessinger House is a historic home located near Lexington, Lexington County, South Carolina. It was built about 1891, and is a two-story, rectangular, frame farmhouse.  It is sheathed in weatherboard and has a truncated hip roof. The front façade features a projecting Victorian influenced, ornamented double-tiered porch.  Also on the property is a contributing small, frame building used as a garage, but originally operated as a store by in the 1890s and from 1910 to 1935 as a farm commissary.

It was listed on the National Register of Historic Places in 1983.

References 

Houses on the National Register of Historic Places in South Carolina
Houses completed in 1891
Houses in Lexington County, South Carolina
National Register of Historic Places in Lexington County, South Carolina